Puerto Rico Highway 506 (PR-506) is a two-lane tertiary highway in Ponce, Puerto Rico. The road runs south to north, joining PR-52, where PR-506 starts, to PR-14, where it ends. Its length is 2.0 km. The road is entirely within Barrio Coto Laurel.

Route description

In its short 2.0 km length, PR-506 is home to Hospital San Cristóbal, Bolera Caribe, National University College, a pharmacy, a branch of the United States Post Office, a bank, and many restaurants, among other businesses. The southern end of PR-506 also provides access to Industrias Vassallo and Cristalia Premium Water industries.

History
Until 2012 the road ran south to north starting at the easternmost edge of Mercedita International Airport at PR-1 and Camino Buyones, heading north and intersecting with PR-52 and continuing north to intersect with PR-14 where it ended. In that year, however, the Government of Puerto Rico abandoned maintenance of the stretch of the road from its PR-1 intersection to its intersection with PR-52, and the road was signed only from PR-52 to PR-14. At that time, the road was longer than its current 2.0 km.

Major intersections

Related route

Puerto Rico Highway 5506 (PR-5506) is an important tributary of PR-506. This is a two-lane tertiary road which intersects with the southern terminus of PR-10, an important primary highway.

See also

 List of highways in Ponce, Puerto Rico
 List of highways numbered 506

References

External links

 PR-506, Ponce, Puerto Rico

506
Roads in Ponce, Puerto Rico